With the beginning of mobilization in Russia, anti-war and anti-mobilization protests broke out in the Russian Far East, mostly performed by women.  Former Mongolian President Tsakhiagiin Elbegdorj protested against usage of  “The Buryat Mongol, Tuva Mongols, and Kalmyk Mongols" as cannon fodder. He invited the Mongols to Mongolia.  The Tuvans belong to Turkic peoples but are also regarded in Mongolia as one of the Uriankhai peoples.

Sakha

Women protested in Ordzhonikidze Square, in Yakutsk. Some elderly men were conscripted by mistake.

Buryatia
Small groups protested in Ulan-Ude under handwritten signs “No war! No mobilization!” and “Our husbands, fathers and brothers don’t want to kill other husbands and fathers.”  The Free Buryatia Foundation collects appeals for help from families of mobilised men.
Alexandra Garmazhapova, president of the foundation, some local people try to go to Mongolia. 

Two fires were set in Salavat.

Zabaykalsky Krai
Marina Salomatova, a member of the “Transbaikal Civil Solidarity”,  has been arrested in Chita, Zabaykalsky Krai.

Tuva
Women protested against mobilization in Kyzyl, 20 of them were arrested.

See also
2022 North Caucasian protests

References

2022 protests
2022 in Russia
Anti-war protests in Russia
Opposition to Vladimir Putin
Reactions to the 2022 Russian invasion of Ukraine
Resistance during the 2022 Russian invasion of Ukraine
Ulan-Ude
Yakutsk
Sakha Republic
History of Buryatia
History of Zabaykalsky Krai